The Klir Beck House, also known as The Gnomes, was a historic house in Vienna, Maine.  It was an architecturally idiosyncratic house, built by the artist Klir Beck as a summer residence.  It was listed on the National Register of Historic Places in 1977, and was destroyed by fire in 2000.  It was delisted in 2017.

Description and history
The Klir Beck House stood in a rural area of Vienna, west of the village center of adjacent Mount Vernon, in a setting of woods, fields, and lakes.  It was a -story structure, built out of a combination of materials.  It had an irregularly coursed stone foundation, a ground floor finished in half-timbered brick, and the half story was finished in half-timbered stucco.  The roof was gabled, with a cross gable section and main gable end that each feature a projecting hipped overhang, with a carved wooden balcony in the style of a Swiss chateau.  Some of the wall sections created by the half-timbering were further decorated, several exhibiting a lotus pattern on a brick background.  The interior was equally rich and fanciful, including a compass set in stone on the living room floor.

The house was built in 1927 by Klir Beck, in part by adapting and altering an existing 19th-century farmhouse.  Beck was well known in artistic circles, and is credited with creating dioramas that are displayed in the Maine State Museum.  In January 2000, a fire broke out in the basement, resulting in the destruction of the house.

See also
National Register of Historic Places listings in Kennebec County, Maine

References

Houses on the National Register of Historic Places in Maine
Houses completed in 1927
Houses in Kennebec County, Maine
Demolished buildings and structures in Maine
National Register of Historic Places in Kennebec County, Maine
Buildings and structures demolished in 2000
Former National Register of Historic Places in Maine